Capsicum annuum is a species of the plant genus Capsicum native to southern North America, the Caribbean, and northern South America. This species is the most common and extensively cultivated of the five domesticated capsicums. The species encompasses a wide variety of shapes and sizes of peppers, including sweet bell peppers and some chili pepper varieties such as jalapeños, New Mexico chile, and cayenne peppers. Cultivars descended from the wild American bird pepper are still found in warmer regions of the Americas. In the past, some woody forms of this species have been called C. frutescens, but the features that were used to distinguish those forms appear in many populations of C. annuum and are not consistently recognizable features in C. frutescens species.

Characteristics
Although the species name annuum means 'annual' (from the Latin annus "year"), the plant is not an annual but is frost tender. In the absence of winter frosts it can survive several seasons and grow into a large, shrubby perennial herb. The fruits are peppers that may be green, yellow, orange or red when ripe. While the species can tolerate most frost-free climates, C. annuum is especially productive in warm and dry climates.

Pollination
While generally self-pollinating, insect visitation is known to increase the fruit size and speed of ripening, as well as to ensure symmetrical development. Pepper flowers have nectaries at the base of the corolla, which helps to attract pollinators. The anthers do not release pollen except via buzz pollination, such as provided by bumble bees.

Uses

Culinary

The species is a source of popular sweet peppers and hot chilis with numerous varieties cultivated all around the world, and is the source of popular spices such as cayenne, chili, and paprika powders, as well as pimiento (pimento).

Common naming in English falls generally in line with the flavor and size of the variant. Larger, sweeter variants are called "capsicums" in Australia and New Zealand, "peppers" in the United Kingdom and Canada, and "bell peppers" in the United States. The smaller, hotter varieties are called chilis, chilies, chillies, chile, or chili peppers, or in parts of the US, "peppers".

Capsinoid chemicals provide the distinctive tastes in C. annuum variants. In particular, capsaicin creates a burning sensation ("hotness"), which in extreme cases can last for several hours after ingestion. A measurement called the Scoville scale has been created to describe the hotness of peppers and other foods.

Traditional medicine
Hot peppers are used in traditional medicine as well as food in Africa. English botanist John Lindley described C. annuum in his 1838 Flora Medica thus:

In Ayurveda, C. annuum is classified as follows:
Guna (properties) – ruksha (dry), laghu (light) and tikshna (sharp)
Rasa (taste) – katu (pungent)
Virya (potency) – ushna (hot)

Ornamental
Some cultivars grown specifically for their aesthetic value include the U.S. National Arboretum's 'Black Pearl' and the 'Bolivian Rainbow'. Ornamental varieties tend to have unusually colored fruit and foliage with colors such as black and purple being notable. All are edible, and most (like 'Royal Black') are hot.

Host plant
The potato tuber moth (Phthorimaea operculella) is an oligophagous insect that prefers to feed on plants of the family Solanaceae such as pepper plants. Female P. operculella use the leaves to lay their eggs and the hatched larvae will eat away at the mesophyll of the leaf.

Gallery

See also
List of Capsicum cultivars
Paprika
Chili pepper

References

Further reading

External links
 
 
 

annuum
Plants described in 1753
Taxa named by Carl Linnaeus
Medicinal plants of North America
Medicinal plants of South America
Plants used in Ayurveda
Chili peppers